Michael Joseph Hough  (born November 4, 1979) is an American politician who served in the Maryland Senate, representing District 4 in Frederick and Carroll Counties. He was formerly a Delegate and chairman and of the Frederick County Republican Central Committee. He is a former Maryland state chair of the American Legislative Exchange Council (ALEC).

Education
Hough received a bachelor's degree in Political Science from Towson University.

Career
Hough served in the United States Air Force as a Minuteman-III missile maintenance technician; he was stationed at F.E. Warren Air Force Base in Cheyenne, Wyoming. Michael previously served as the legislative aide to Maryland State Senator Alex X. Mooney. He was also the campaign manager for Sen. Mooney's successful re-election campaign. In 2006, Hough ran for and won a position on the Frederick County Republican Central Committee.

A seat in the House of Delegates opened up unexpectedly in 2009 when Republican-turned-Independent Delegate Richard Weldon resigned. Hough was nominated by the Frederick and Washington County Republican leadership to serve out the rest of Weldon's term, along with Frederick County Commissioner Charles A. Jenkins. Both names were submitted to Governor Martin O'Malley, who ultimately selected Jenkins to complete the term.

Hough ran against Jenkins when the term expired in 2010 and defeated him 68%-32%.

Redistricting after the 2010 election placed Hough in the new 4th District, which included almost none of the District 3B he was representing. Nevertheless, Hough decided to run for State Senate, challenging incumbent Republican David R. Brinkley. Hough accused Brinkley of being a "tax-and-spend liberal" and of being too close to the Democratic majority and then-Governor Martin O'Malley. Hough defeated Brinkley in the primary election, 68%-32%.

In May 2021, Hough announced that he would run for Frederick County Executive in 2022 rather than seek reelection. He was defeated in the general election by county councilmember Jessica Fitzwater on November 8, 2022, receiving 49.7 percent of the vote to Fitzwater's 50.4 percent.

Electoral history
2014 Race for Maryland State Senate – District 4
{| class="wikitable"
|-
!Name
!Votes
!Percent
!Outcome
|-
|-
|Michael Hough, Rep.
|31,414
|  67.7%
|   Won
|-
|-
|Dan Rupli, Dem.
|14,873
|  32.1%
|   Lost
|}

2014 Republican Primary Race for Maryland State Senate – District 4
{| class="wikitable"
|-
!Name
!Votes
!Percent
!Outcome
|-
|-
|Michael Hough, Rep.
|8,946
|  67.7%
|   Won
|-
|-
|David R. Brinkley, Rep.
|4,261
|  32.3%
|   Lost
|}

2010 Race for Maryland State Delegate – District 3B
{| class="wikitable"
|-
!Name
!Votes
!Percent
!Outcome
|-
|-
|Michael Hough, Rep.
|10,090
|  57.4%
|   Won
|-
|-
|Paul Gilligan, Dem.
|7,444
|  42.4%
|   Lost
|}

See also
 Justin Ready (R-District 5 Carroll County)

References

External links
 
 
 
 
 

People from Silver Spring, Maryland
Living people
Towson University alumni
Republican Party Maryland state senators
Republican Party members of the Maryland House of Delegates
1979 births
People from Brunswick, Maryland
21st-century American politicians